Karl Dürschmied (3 November 1896 – 27 June 1948) was an Austrian footballer. He played in one match for the Austria national football team in 1926.

References

External links
 
 

1896 births
1948 deaths
Austrian footballers
Austria international footballers
Footballers from Vienna
Association football forwards
Wiener AC players